Chongdan Field(청단군습지) is a 1,000 ha wetland protected area in South Hwanghae Province of North Korea.  It and its surrounds, including rice paddies, have been identified by BirdLife International as a 2500 ha Important Bird Area (IBA) because it supports populations of swan geese, whooper swans, black-faced spoonbills, red-crowned cranes, long-billed plovers, Far Eastern curlews and Nordmann's greenshanks.

References

Important Bird Areas of North Korea
Wetlands of North Korea
South Hwanghae